A list of films produced by the Tollywood (Bengali language film industry) based in Kolkata in the year 1935.

A-Z of films

Gallery

References

 Bengali Film Directory – edited by Ansu Sur, Nandan, Calcutta, 1999

1935
Lists of 1935 films by country or language
Films, Bengali